Tsuen Wan is the northern terminus of the MTR  in Hong Kong. It is the only station on the Tsuen Wan line at ground level. It is located in the northern central part of Tsuen Wan New Town, New Territories West.

It was also the northernmost station in the MTR system until the MTR–KCR merger.

History
The station opened as part of the line opening on 10 May 1982. A commemorative plaque in the station concourse, near exit A, was unveiled by Acting Governor Sir Philip Haddon-Cave. The station was designed as an intermediate station with two side platforms, with trains terminating at Tsuen Wan West, further northwest near Tsuen King Garden, different from the present  Tsuen Wan West station. The area around the proposed terminus had a poor development record and it was decided to not build a station there, even though tracks had already been laid. This explains why the station uses different platforms for loading and unloading. After leaving the unloading platform, trains enter the section of track beyond the station to proceed to the Tsuen Wan Depot or reverse back to the loading platform to head towards .

During the construction of the station, Route Twisk was diverted. The famous Sam Tung Uk walled village was also relocated, though it was later preserved as a museum.

New roads and shopping centres were set up around the station, and a private housing estate was also built directly above the station. A bus interchange was set up under one of the shopping centres.

Usage
The usage of the station was not very high when it opened in 1982 as the station was located in the northern edge of Tsuen Wan town and the connecting infrastructure was incomplete, making it difficult to attract residents in the town centre to take the MTR.

With over 20 years of development, the area around the station gradually took over as the town centre. Several shopping malls were constructed near the station, and an extensive footbridge network was built to connect to nearby shopping malls, the original town centre, and some villages to the north. The station also acts as an important transportation interchange, with numerous bus and minibus routes serving near the station. Commuters from northwest New Territories used to change buses at this station to continue their journey into Kowloon by MTR, before the  opened in 2003.

Refurbishment
The station was refurbished twice. In the early 1990s, a Chinese-style design was introduced inside the station. This design was completely removed after the second refurbishment in 2004, where more shops were set up in the station (a common practice of MTR station refurbishments in the 2000s). Gates were relocated to handle more passengers.

Station layout
Platforms 1 and 2 are both located at ground level, and the tracks are located right next to each other. One platform is used for boarding and the other is used for alighting. Two new exits have been built next to Platform 1, allowing passengers to leave the station without going up the escalators and coming back down again. Passengers entering the station via these exits will have to take an escalator up to the concourse, cross to the other side for the down escalator for Platform 2.

Entrances and exits
Concourse (U1)
 A1: New Town Mall 
 A2: Bus Terminus 
 A3: Government Offices, Discovery Park 
 A4: Bus Stop
 B1: Fou Wah Centre 
 B2: Kolour Tsuen Wan, Panda Hotel 
 B3: Sai Lau Kok Road
 C: Luk Yeung Sun Chuen 
Platform 1 (G)
 D: Green Minibus Stop 
 E: Sam Tung Uk Museum

References

MTR stations in the New Territories
Tsuen Wan line
Railway stations in Hong Kong opened in 1982
1982 establishments in Hong Kong
Extra areas operated by NT taxis